Goldberg is a town in the Ludwigslust-Parchim district, in Mecklenburg-Western Pomerania, Germany. It is situated 24 km northeast of Parchim, and 46 km east of Schwerin.

History
Goldberg owes its origin and name to a gold mine in the neighbourhood, which, however, has been wholly abandoned since the time of the Hussite wars. The town obtained civic rights in 1211. It suffered heavily from the Tatars in 1241, from the plague in 1334, from the Hussites in 1428, and from the Saxon, Imperial and Swedish forces during the Thirty Years' War. On 27 May 1813 a battle took place near it between the French and the Russians; and on the 23rd and 27 August of the same year fights between the allies and the French.

People born in the town

 Peter Larisch (born 1950), handball player

Connected to Goldberg

 Gerd Wessig (born 1959 in Lübz), Olympian winner and world record holder (2,36 m) in the jump, grew up in Goldberg and went to school there

References

Gallery

Cities and towns in Mecklenburg
Ludwigslust-Parchim
Populated places established in the 13th century
1240s establishments in the Holy Roman Empire
1248 establishments in Europe
Grand Duchy of Mecklenburg-Schwerin